Steve Lawrence (born Sidney Liebowitz; July 8, 1935) is an American singer, comedian and actor, best known as a member of a duo with his wife Eydie Gormé, billed as "Steve and Eydie", and for his performance as Maury Sline, the manager and friend of the main characters in The Blues Brothers. Steve and Eydie first appeared together as regulars on Tonight Starring Steve Allen in 1954 and continued performing as a duo until Gormé's retirement in 2009. Gormé died August 10, 2013.

Early life
Lawrence was born as Sidney Liebowitz to Jewish parents in the Brooklyn borough of New York City. His father, Max, was a cantor at the Brooklyn synagogue Beth Sholom Tomchei Harav. His mother, Helen, was a homemaker. He attended Thomas Jefferson High School.  During his high school years, Lawrence earned some money after school singing for songwriters in the Brill Building.

Career
When he was only 18, Lawrence was hired by Steve Allen to be one of the singers on Allen's local New York City late night show on WNBC-TV in 1953, along with Eydie  Gormé and Andy Williams. When the show got picked up by NBC to be seen on the national network, becoming "The Tonight Show," Lawrence, Gormé and Williams stayed on until the program's end in 1957. 

In the late 1950s, Steve Lawrence was drafted into the United States Army and served as the official vocal soloist with The United States Army Band "Pershing's Own" in Washington, D.C.

Lawrence had success on the record charts in the late 1950s and early 1960s with such hits as "Go Away Little Girl" (U.S. No. 1), "Pretty Blue Eyes" (U.S. No. 9), "Footsteps" (U.S. No. 7), "Portrait of My Love" (U.S. No. 9), and "Party Doll" (U.S. No. 5). "Go Away Little Girl" sold over one million copies and was awarded a Gold record. However, much of Lawrence's musical career has centered on nightclubs and the musical stage. 

Lawrence is also an actor, appearing in guest roles on television shows in every decade since the 1950s.  After getting his start with Steve Allen's late night show, he was seen in programs such as The Danny Kaye Show, The Judy Garland Show, The Julie Andrews Hour, Night Gallery, The Flip Wilson Show, Police Story, Murder, She Wrote, and CSI. 

Lawrence and Gormé starred in the 1958 summer replacement series on NBC, The Steve Lawrence and Eydie Gormé Show. Lawrence made many appearances on The Carol Burnett Show (1967–78), with and without Eydie. The Steve Lawrence Show, with supporting actor Charles Nelson Reilly, ran for 13 weeks in 1965, a variety show that was one of the last CBS television shows to only air in black and white. Lawrence also served as a panelist on What's My Line? (1950–67).

In 1964, Lawrence starred in the Broadway musical What Makes Sammy Run?.  It centered on an ambitious young man clawing his way to the top in Hollywood.  It ran for 504 performances at the 54th Street Theater.

Lawrence and Gormé appeared together in the Broadway musical Golden Rainbow, which ran from February 1968 to January 1969. Although the show was not a huge success (a summary of this experience is chronicled in unflattering detail in William Goldman's 1968 book The Season), the show contained the memorable song "I've Gotta Be Me". This song was originally sung by Lawrence at the end of the first act of the musical. Sammy Davis, Jr. later recorded a version of the song that hit number 11 on the U.S. Billboard Hot 100 singles chart in 1969.

Lawrence starred as Gary McBride in the 1972 film Stand Up and Be Counted, opposite Jacqueline Bisset and Stella Stevens. In 1980, he was introduced to a new generation of fans with his portrayal of Maury Sline in The Blues Brothers, and reprised the role in the 1998 sequel Blues Brothers 2000. Lawrence's other films include the Steve Martin comedy The Lonely Guy (1984) and the crime thriller The Yards (2000).

In 1984, Lawrence and comedian Don Rickles hosted ABC's Foul-Ups, Bleeps & Blunders.

In 1985, Steve and Eydie played Tweedledee (Gormé) and Tweedledum (Lawrence) in Irwin Allen's film adaptation of Alice in Wonderland.

Lawrence played Mark McCormick's father, Sonny Daye, in two episodes of Hardcastle and McCormick. In 1999, he appeared as the much-talked about, but never really seen, Morty Fine, father of Fran Fine in a few of the final episodes of The Nanny. In 2011, he portrayed Jack, a wealthy love interest of Betty White's character, Elka Ostrovsky, on Hot in Cleveland. In 2014, he guest-starred in an episode of Two and a Half Men on CBS, and sang the theme song to the parody miniseries The Spoils of Babylon.

Personal life

Lawrence and Gormé married on December 29, 1957, at the El Rancho Vegas in Las Vegas, Nevada. 
They had two sons together; David Nessim Lawrence (b. 1960) is an ASCAP Award-winning composer, who wrote the score for High School Musical, and Michael Robert Lawrence (1962–1986), who died suddenly from ventricular fibrillation resulting from an undiagnosed heart condition at the age of 23. Michael was an assistant editor for a television show at the time of his death and was apparently healthy despite a previous diagnosis of slight arrhythmia.

Gormé and Lawrence were in Atlanta, Georgia, at the time of Michael's death, having performed at the Fox Theater the night before. Upon learning of the death, family friend Frank Sinatra sent his private plane to fly the couple to New York to meet David, who was attending school at the time. Following their son's death, Gormé and Lawrence took a year off before touring again.

Eydie Gormé died on August 10, 2013 at age 84, after a brief, undisclosed illness.

In June 2019, following public speculation about his health, Lawrence announced that he was in the early stages of Alzheimer's disease and that treatment to slow its progression had so far been successful.

Awards
Lawrence received a New York Drama Critics' Circle Award and a Tony Award nomination for his performance as Sammy Glick in What Makes Sammy Run? on Broadway (1964), and two Emmy Awards, one for production for Steve & Eydie Celebrate Irving Berlin (1978).

With Gormé, he has been the recipient of two Emmys for Our Love is Here to Stay, a tribute to George and Ira Gershwin; a "Best Performance By a Vocal Duo or Group" Grammy Award for We Got Us; a Film Advisory Board's Award of Excellence and a Television Critics Circle Award for From This Moment On, a tribute to Cole Porter.

The duo also won a Las Vegas Entertainment Award for "Musical Variety Act of the Year" four times, three of them consecutively. They were honored with a lifetime achievement award from the Songwriters Hall of Fame, and in 1995 were the recipients of an Ella Lifetime Achievement Award from the Society of Singers, a non-profit organization that helps professional singers with counseling and financial assistance.

Discography

References

External links

Radio interview with Steve Lawrence "Big Band Files w/Doug Miles" WSLR
Steve Lawrence Discography - All Countries - 45cat Steve Lawrence 45rpm catalogue

1935 births
Living people
Male actors from New York City
Jewish American musicians
Singers from New York City
United States Army soldiers
American male pop singers
American male comedians
American male musical theatre actors
American male television actors
Grammy Award winners
Jewish American male actors
Jewish singers
King Records artists
Traditional pop music singers
ABC Records artists
Columbia Records artists
Musicians from Brooklyn
People with Alzheimer's disease
Thomas Jefferson High School (Brooklyn) alumni
21st-century American Jews